is a former Japanese football player.

Club statistics

References

External links

1978 births
Living people
Toin University of Yokohama alumni
Association football people from Shizuoka Prefecture
Japanese footballers
J1 League players
J2 League players
Ventforet Kofu players
Tokushima Vortis players
JEF United Chiba players
Iwate Grulla Morioka players
Association football goalkeepers